Newbury Park can refer to:
Newbury Park, California
Newbury Park High School
Newbury Park, London